Burleigh is an unincorporated community in northeast Austin County, in the U.S. state of Texas. According to the Handbook of Texas, its population was 69 from 1972 through 2000. It is located within the Greater Houston metropolitan area.

Geography
FM 331 connects with State Highway 36,  to the south. For  at Burleigh, FM 331 shares the right-of-way with FM 529, then it heads north  before state maintenance ends at Oil Field Road.

History
The eastern part of Austin County was first settled in the 1820s, but the community itself did not appear until the late 19th century. A post office began operating out of a general store in Burleigh in 1893, but it closed in 1913. As late as 1968 the population was reckoned at about 150 souls, but in 1972 there were only 69 persons and remained at that level through 2000. There were three churches in Burleigh in the early 1980s.

Camp Gillespie, a Confederate prison, was located in Burleigh.

Education
Burleigh had its own school in 1918 and had 62 students enrolled. It then had two schools in the early 1880s. Today, the community is served by the Bellville Independent School District.

Gallery

References

Unincorporated communities in Austin County, Texas
Unincorporated communities in Texas